Quintana del Castillo is a municipality located in the province of León, Castile and León, Spain.  (data from INE), the municipality has a population of 909 inhabitants.

It is part of the historical region of La Cepeda.

Villages
Abano
Castro de Cepeda
Donillas
Escuredo
Ferreras
Morriondo
Palaciosmil
Quintana del Castillo
Riofrío
San Feliz de las Lavanderas
La Veguellina de Cepeda
Villameca
Villarmeriel

See also
 Leonese language
 Kingdom of León

References

Municipalities in the Province of León
La Cepeda